Bae Yoon-kyung (born Bae Yoon-kyung; January 22, 1993) is a South Korean actress and model. She is known for her lead roles in Joseon Beauty Pageant (2018) and The King's Affection (2021). She also appeared in dramas The Miracle We Met (2018), Doctor Prisoner (2019)., Hi Bye, Mama! (2020), My Unfamiliar Family (2020), and Undercover (2021).

Filmography

Television series

Web series

Television shows

Awards and nominations

References

External links 
 
 
 
 Bae Yoon-kyung at Lucky Entertainment 

1993 births
Living people
21st-century South Korean actresses
South Korean female models
South Korean television actresses
Konkuk University alumni